Bœuil Abbey, also called Our Lady Abbey (Abbaye Notre-Dame), was a Cistercian monastery in Veyrac, Limousin, France. It was destroyed during the French Revolution.

History
The abbey was probably founded in 1123 by Ramnulphe de Nieul, Dean of the chapter of Dorat, as the daughter house of Dalon Abbey. The latter took on the Cistercian Rule in 1126, in line with Pontigny Abbey; so did Bœuil. Bœuil prospered and founded a daughter house at Saint-Léonard des Chaumes in the province of Aunis.

Like many other abbeys in the 15th century, Bœuil Abbey and its goods were placed under the authority of a layman for whom the monastery was a source of revenue rather than a place of worship. Despite several attempts of recovery, the abbey continued to decline.

In 1790, the Revolutionaries ousted the only remaining monk and destroyed the abbey. Although the abbey was still visible on the cadastral plan in 1808, the site was turned into a quarry in the 19th century. No remnants of the abbey are visible today.

According to Janauschek, Bœuil Abbey had the order number CCCLXXVII (377).

See also
List of Cistercian monasteries in France

References

Bibliography

 

Cistercian monasteries in France
12th-century establishments in France
1123 establishments
Buildings and structures in Haute-Vienne
Monasteries destroyed during the French Revolution